"It's Like That" is the debut single of American hip hop group Run-D.M.C., released in 1983 by Profile Records. The song was remixed by house DJ Jason Nevins in 1997. His version was originally released in 1997 on 10-inch vinyl in the United States and became a sleeper hit in 1998. It sold around five million copies worldwide, placing it amongst the biggest selling singles of all time. In 2008, it was ranked number 40 on VH1's "100 Greatest Hip-Hop Songs".

Run-D.M.C. version
"It's Like That" was first released in 1983 backed with the track "Sucker M.C.'s". The release marked the start of Run-D.M.C.'s career and is widely regarded as ushering in a new school of hip hop artists with a street image and an abrasive, minimalist sound that marked them out from their predecessors. Both tracks were collected on the trio's eponymous debut album in 1984. "It's Like That" is about life in the area where the group lives (unemployment, prices, death, etc.). Despite protesting those social and political problems, the song takes on a hopeful message encouraging listeners to abandon prejudice and to believe in themselves. In 2001, parts of the song was sampled in Jagged Edge's "Let's Get Married (Remix)" featuring Run-D.M.C. The single was an international success.

The song would be named by fans one of Run-D.M.C.'s signature songs.

In the re-release of the album in 2004, a booklet was included, and a reviewer, Angus Batey, wrote the background information about the album. When he wrote about "It's like That", he stated:

The song was mixed by Kurtis Blow and Elai Tubo.

Track listing
All tracks written by Darryl McDaniels, Joe Simmons and Larry Smith.

 12-inch Profile – PRO-7019 (US)
 "It's Like That" – 7:25
 "Sucker M.C.'s (Krush Groove 1)" – 3:15
 "It's Like That" (Instrumental) – 7:10
 "Sucker M.C.'s (Krush Groove 1)" (Instrumental) – 3:05

Charts

Jason Nevins version

In 1997, a new version of "It's Like That" by American producer Jason Nevins was released. The Nevins version topped the singles charts in 12 countries, including the United Kingdom, where it stayed at the top for six weeks and became Britain's third biggest-selling single of 1998. In the UK, the Nevins remix gained notoriety for breaking the Spice Girls' run of consecutive number-one hits on the UK Singles Chart, keeping their song "Stop" from claiming the top spot.

Critical reception
Larry Flick from Billboard wrote, "The lines dividing rap and dance music are momentarily blurred on this revision of a Run-D.M.C. chestnut. Their rhymes are sewn into a forceful, house-inflected groove by underground club dynamo Nevins, who displays a palpable talent for combining hard-edged flavor with ear-grabbing hooks. Club DJs have already turned this into a dancefloor staple, with crossover radio mix-show programmers also banging it like crazy. It won't be long before folks can hear it during morning-drive hours." A writer from Scottish Daily Record declared this version as "pure brilliant". Matt Diehl from Entertainment Weekly gave it an A, commenting, "The combination of Run-D.M.C.'s old-school braggadocio and Nevins' new-school grooves demonstrates how club sounds constantly revitalize themselves, as well as displaying the historical links between seemingly disparate dance-music styles. Most important, it rocks the house."

Music video
The accompanying music video for the remix featured male vs. female breakdance crews battling each other. The video was shot in downtown LA in 1998 after the song became a hit in Europe. Nevins is in the beginning of the video wearing his 'well known yellow tinted glasses' and holding a boombox.

Track listings
 US 12-inch single
A1. "It's Like That" (Drop the Break) – 8:20
A2. "It's Like That" (Battle Beat Dub) – 4:48
B1. "It's Like That" (Jason's Battle Blaster) – 8:21
B2. "It's Like That" (Acapella Break) – 1:28
B3. "It's Like That" (Bonus Beat Break) – 8:20

 CD maxi, Australian CD single
 "It's Like That" (Drop the Break – radio edit) – 4:09	
 "It's Like That" (Jason's Battle Blaster) – 8:21	
 "It's Like That" (Drop the Break) – 8:20

Charts and certifications

Weekly charts

Year-end charts

Certifications

Release history

References

1983 debut singles
1983 songs
1998 singles
Dutch Top 40 number-one singles
Hip house songs
Irish Singles Chart number-one singles
Jason Nevins songs
Number-one singles in Australia
Number-one singles in Denmark
Number-one singles in Finland
Number-one singles in Germany
Number-one singles in Iceland
Number-one singles in New Zealand
Number-one singles in Norway
Number-one singles in Scotland
Number-one singles in Sweden
Number-one singles in Switzerland
Run-DMC songs
Songs written by Darryl McDaniels
Songs written by Jam Master Jay
Songs written by Joseph Simmons
UK Independent Singles Chart number-one singles
UK Singles Chart number-one singles